The Norfolk Micropolitan Statistical Area, as defined by the United States Census Bureau, is an area consisting of three counties in Nebraska, anchored by the city of Norfolk.

At the 2000 census, the μSA had a population of 49,538 (though a July 1, 2009, estimate placed the population at 48,000).

Counties
Madison
Pierce
Stanton

Communities
Places with 20,000 or more inhabitants
Norfolk (Principal City)
Places with 1,000 to 5,000 inhabitants
Battle Creek
Tilden (partial)
Madison
Pierce
Plainview
Stanton
Places with less than 1,000 inhabitants
Foster
Hadar
McLean
Meadow Grove
Newman Grove (partial)
Osmond
Pilger

Demographics
At the 2000 census, there were 49,538 people, 18,712 households and 12,819 families residing within the μSA. The racial makeup of the μSA was 93.21% White, 0.73% African American, 0.96% Native American, 0.34% Asian, 0.03% Pacific Islander, 3.82% from other races, and 0.92% from two or more races. Hispanic or Latino of any race were 6.55% of the population.

The median household income in the μSA was $34,907 and the median family income was $42,204. Males had a median income of $28,388 compared with $20,336 for females. The per capita income for the μSA was $16,098.

See also
Nebraska census statistical areas

References

 
Madison County, Nebraska
Pierce County, Nebraska
Stanton County, Nebraska